The Hastings and Prince Edward Regiment is a Primary Reserve infantry regiment of the Canadian Army. The regiment is part of 33 Canadian Brigade Group, one of four brigade groups of 4th Canadian Division. The regimental headquarters and one company (A Company, Assoro Company) are located at 187 Pinnacle Street in Belleville, with additional companies in Peterborough and Cobourg. The Peterborough Armoury houses what was traditionally B Company or Moro Company, and C Company or Cassino Company is housed in an industrial mall unit on Willmott Street in Cobourg. Normally, the regiment deploys as a composite, Ortona Company, while the headquarters and administration form Somme Company.

The commanding officer is Lieutenant-Colonel Marc Gallant, who took over from Lieutenant-Colonel Roy van den Berg on 1 September 2021. Commanding officers normally hold the position for a term of three years. The regimental sergeant major is Chief Warrant Officer Roderick McNeil. The colonel-in-chief is Prince Edward, Earl of Wessex, who visited the regiment in June 2005 and received a guard of honour from the regiment during his visit to Old Fort Henry in Kingston in June 2008.

Lineage

9th Anti-Tank Regiment (Self-Propelled) (Argyll Light Infantry), RCA 

Originated 16 January 1863 in Belleville, Ontario as the 15th Battalion Volunteer Militia (Infantry) Canada
Redesignated 2 June 1871 as the 15th Battalion or the Argyll Light Infantry
Redesignated 8 May 1900 as the 15th Regiment Argyll Light Infantry
Redesignated 12 March 1920 The Argyll Light Infantry
Redesignated 15 December 1936 as The Argyll Light Infantry (Tank)
Redesignated 7 November 1940 as The (Reserve) Argyll Light Infantry (Tank)
Amalgamated 1 April 1946 with the 44th (Reserve) Field Regiment, RCA, converted to artillery, and redesignated as the 9th Anti-Tank Regiment (Self-Propelled) (Argyll Light Infantry), RCA
Amalgamated 1 September 1954 with the 34th Anti-Tank Battery (Self Propelled), RCA, The Hastings and Prince Edward Regiment and The Midland Regiment, converted to infantry, and redesignated as The Hastings and Prince Edward Regiment.

The 16th Battalion Volunteer Militia (Infantry) Canada
Originated 6 February 1863 in Picton, Ontario as the 16th Battalion Volunteer Militia (Infantry) Canada
Redesignated 30 November 1866 as the 16th Prince Edward Battalion of Infantry
Redesignated 8 May 1900 as the 16th Prince Edward Regiment
Amalgamated 12 March 1920 with the 49th Regiment Hastings Rifles to form The Hastings and Prince Edward Regiment
Redesignated 7 November 1940 as the 2nd (Reserve) Battalion, The Hastings and Prince Edward Regiment
Redesignated 1 November 1945 as The Hastings and Prince Edward Regiment
Amalgamated 1 September 1954 with the 9th Anti-Tank Regiment (Self Propelled), RCA, the 34th Anti- Tank Battery (Self Propelled), RCA, and The Midland Regiment, retaining its designation

The 44th (Reserve) Field Regiment, RCA
Originated 1 June 1905 in Gananoque, Ontario, as the 9th Brigade, Canadian Field Artillery
Redesignated 1 July 1925 as the 9th Field Brigade, Canadian Artillery
Redesignated 3 June 1935 as the 9th Field Brigade, RCA
Redesignated 7 November 1940 as the 9th (Reserve) Field Brigade, RCA
Redesignated 24 June 1942 as the 44th (Reserve) Field Regiment, RCA
Amalgamated 1 April 1946 with The (Reserve) Argyll Light Infantry (Tank)

The 34th Anti-Tank Battery (Self-Propelled), RCA
Originated 1 April 1912 in Belleville, Ontario, as the 34th Battery, CFA
Redesignated 1 July 1925 as the 34th Field Battery, CA
Redesignated 3 June 1935 as the 34th Field Battery, RCA
Redesignated 7 November 1940 as the 34th (Reserve) Field Battery, RCA
Redesignated 1 April 1946 as the 34th Anti-Tank Battery (Self-Propelled), RCA
Amalgamated 1 September 1954 with the 9th Anti-Tank Regiment (Self Propelled), RCA, The Hastings and Prince Edward Regiment and The Midland Regiment

The 49th Regiment Hastings Rifles
Originated 14 September 1866 in Stirling, Ontario, as the 49th Hastings Battalion of Infantry
Redesignated 6 April 1871 as the 49th Hastings Battalion of Rifles
Redesignated 8 May 1900 as the 49th Regiment Hastings Rifles
Amalgamated 12 March 1920 with the 16th Prince Edward Regiment

The Midland Regiment 

Originated 5 October 1866 in Cobourg, Ontario, as the 40th Northumberland Battalion of Infantry
Redesignated 8 May 1900 as the 40th Northumberland Regiment
Redesignated 12 March 1920 as The Northumberland (Ontario) Regiment
Redesignated 15 May 1924 as The Northumberland Regiment
Amalgamated 15 December 1936 with The Durham Regiment and redesignated as The Midland Regiment (Northumberland and Durham) 
Redesignated 7 November 1940 as the 2nd (Reserve) Battalion, The Midland Regiment (Northumberland and Durham)
Redesignated 1 June 1945 as The Midland Regiment (Northumberland and Durham)
Redesignated 1 April 1946 as The Midland Regiment
Amalgamated 1 September 1954 with the 9th Anti-Tank Regiment (Self Propelled), RCA, 34th Anti-Tank Battery (Self Propelled), RCA and The Hastings and Prince Edward Regiment.

The Durham Regiment 

 Originated on 16 November 1866, in Port Hope, Ontario, as the 46th East Durham Battalion of Infantry
 Redesignated on 1 August 1897, as the 46th Durham Battalion of Infantry
 Redesignated on 8 May 1900, as the 46th Durham Regiment
 Redesignated on 12 March 1920, as The Durham Regiment
 Amalgamated on 15 December 1936, with The Northumberland Regiment and Redesignated as The Midland Regiment (Northumberland and Durham)

Perpetuations

War of 1812

Prior to the War of 1812 Upper Canada passed the Militia Act of 1808 in anticipation of threats coming from the Americans.

1st Regiment of Durham Militia
1st Regiment of Hastings Militia
1st Regiment of Northumberland Militia
1st Regiment of Prince Edward Militia

Great War
9th Brigade, Canadian Field Artillery, CEF
39th Battalion, CEF
80th Battalion, CEF
136th Battalion (Durham), CEF
139th Battalion (Northumberland), CEF
155th Battalion (Quinte), CEF
254th Battalion (Quinte's Own), CEF

Operational history

Fenian Raids
The 15th Battalion Volunteer Militia (Infantry), Canada was called out on active service during the 1866 raids by the Fenian Brotherhood on 8 March 1866. The battalion was removed from active service on 27 March 1866 at the conclusion of the emergency.

North West Rebellion
The 15th Battalion Argyll Light Infantry, the 40th Northumberland Battalion of Infantry, the 46th East Durham Battalion of Infantry and The 49th Hastings Battalion of Rifles mobilized a company each for active service with The Midland Battalion on 10 April 1885. The Midland Battalion served in the Alberta Column of the North West Field Force until it was demobilized on 24 July 1885.

Great War
The 9th Brigade, Canadian Field Artillery, CEF, was authorized on 20 January 1916 and embarked for Great Britain on 15 February 1916. The Brigade arrived in France on 14 July 1916, where it fought as part of the 3rd Canadian Divisional Artillery in France and Flanders until the end of the war. The brigade was disbanded on 1 November 1920.

The 39th Battalion, CEF, was authorized on 7 November 1914 and embarked for Great Britain on 17 June 1915. It provided reinforcements to Canadian units in the field until 4 January 1917, when its personnel were absorbed by the 6th Reserve Battalion, CEF.

The 80th Battalion, CEF, was authorized on 10 July 1915 and embarked for Great Britain on 20 May 1916. It provided reinforcements to Canadian units in the field until 30 September 1916, when its personnel were absorbed by units of the 4th Canadian Division.

The 155th (Quinte) Battalion, CEF, was authorized on 22 December 1915 and embarked for Great Britain on 17 October 1916, where it provided reinforcements to Canadian units in the field until 8 December 1916, when its personnel were absorbed by the 154th (Stormont-Dundas-Glengarry) Battalion, CEF. The 39th, 80th and 155th Battalions were all disbanded on 17 July 1917.

The 136th (Durham) Battalion, CEF authorized on 22 December 1915 and embarked for Great Britain on 25 September 1916, where its personnel were absorbed by the 39th Reserve Battalion, CEF on 6 October 1916 to provide reinforcements to Canadian units in the field. The 136th Battalion was disbanded on 22 May 1917.

The 139th (Northumberland) Battalion, CEF, was authorized on 22 December 1915 and embarked for Great Britain on 27 September 1916 where its personnel were absorbed by the 36th Reserve Battalion, CEF on 6 October 1916 to provide reinforcements to Canadian units in the field. The battalion was disbanded on 21 May 1917.

The 254th Battalion (Quinte's Own), CEF, was authorized on 1 May 1917 and embarked for Great Britain on 2 June 1917, where its personnel were absorbed by the 6th Reserve Battalion, CEF, on 10 June 1917 to provide reinforcements to Canadian units in the field. The battalion was disbanded on 15 September 1917.

On 12 March 1920 the 16th Battalion Volunteer Militia (Infantry) Canada was amalgamated with the 49th Regiment Hastings Rifles to form The Hastings and Prince Edward Regiment.

Second World War
The Hastings and Prince Edward Regiment, CASF, mobilized for active service on 1 September 1939 and was redesignated the 1st Battalion, The Hastings and Prince Edward Regiment, CASF, on 7 November 1940. The unit embarked for Great Britain on 22 December 1939, and on 13 June 1940 it went to France as part of the Second British Expeditionary Force, reaching a point beyond Laval before being ordered back to the United Kingdom. It landed in Sicily on 10 July 1943, and in Italy on 3 September 1943, as part of the 1st Canadian Infantry Brigade,1st Canadian Infantry Division. On 10 March 1945, the battalion moved with the I Canadian Corps to northwest Europe, where it fought until the end of the war. The overseas battalion was disbanded on 15 October 1945. On 1 June 1945, a second Battalion of the regiment was mobilized for service in the Pacific theatre of operations as the 2nd Canadian Infantry Battalion (The Hastings and Prince Edward Regiment), CASF. The 2nd Battalion was disbanded on 1 November 1945.

Details from The Midland Regiment were called out on service on 26 August 1939 and then placed on active service on 1 September 1939, for local protection duties under the designation The Midland Regiment (Northumberland and Durham), CASF (Details). These details were disbanded on 31 December 1940. The regiment then mobilized The Midland Regiment (Northumberland and Durham), CASF, for active service on 24 May 1940 and was redesignated the 1st Battalion, The Midland Regiment (Northumberland and Durham), CASF, on 7 November 1940. The 1st Battalion served in Canada in a home defence role as part of the Prince Rupert Defences, 8th Canadian Infantry Division. The Battalion embarked for Great Britain on 10 January 1945, where it was disbanded on 18 January 1945 to provide reinforcements to the Canadian Army in the field.

The 34th Field Battery, RCA, and the 32nd (Kingston) Field Battery, RCA, mobilized the 32nd/34th Field Battery, RCA, CASF, for active service on 24 May 1940. This unit was subsequently reorganized as two separate batteries on 1 January 1941, designated as the 32nd (Kingston) Field Battery, RCA, CASF, and the 34th Field Battery, RCA, CASF. On D-Day, 6 June 1944, it landed in Normandy, France, as part of the 14th Field Regiment, RCA, CASF, which fought as a unit of the 3rd Canadian Infantry Division in North-West Europe until the end of the war. The overseas battery was disbanded on 2 November 1945. The battery later mobilized the 2nd/34th Field Battery, RCA, CAOF, on 1 June 1945 for service with the Canadian Army Occupation Force in Germany. This battery was disbanded on 28 March 1946.

Cold War
On 4 May 1951, the Hastings and Prince Edward Regiment mobilized two temporary Active Force companies designated "E" and "F". "E" Company was reduced to nil strength upon its personnel being incorporated into the 1st Canadian Infantry Battalion for service in Germany with the North Atlantic Treaty Organization. It was disbanded on 29 July 1953. "F" Company was initially used as a reinforcement pool for "E" Company. On 15 May 1952, it was reduced to nil strength, upon its personnel being absorbed by the newly formed 2nd Canadian Infantry Battalion for service in Korea with the United Nations. "F" Company was disbanded on 29 July 1953.

In 1953 the 2nd Canadian Infantry Battalion became the 4th Battalion, The Canadian Guards.

War in Afghanistan
The regiment contributed personnel to the various Task Forces which served in Afghanistan between 2002 and 2014.

The regiment received the Afghanistan battle honour in 2022.

Alliances 

  – The Princess of Wales's Royal Regiment (Queen's and Royal Hampshires)

Battle honours
In the list below, battle honours in capitals were awarded for participation in large operations and campaigns, while those in lowercase indicate honours granted for more specific battles. Those battle honours followed by a "+" are emblazoned on the regimental guidon.

War of 1812
Honorary Distinction:

The non-dmblazonable honorary distinction DEFENCE OF CANADA - 1812-1815 - DÉFENSE DU CANADA

North-West Rebellion

Great War
 2–13 June 1916+
 1 July-18 November 1916+
 8 April-4 May 1917 and 26 August-3 September 1918+
Ypres 1917 31 July-10 November 1917+
 15–25 August 1917+
 8–11 August 1918+
 12 September-9 October 1918+
 28 September-11 November 1918+

Second World War
 9–12 July 1943
Grammichele 15 July 1943
Valguarnera 17–19 July 1943
Assoro 20–22 July 1943+
Agira 24–28 July 1943
 29 July-7 August 1943
Regalbuto 29 July-3 August 1943
+
Landing at Reggio 3 September 1943
Motta Montecorvino 1–3 October 1943 
Campobasso 11–14 October 1943 
Torella 24–27 October 1943 
The Moro 5–7 December 1943+
San Leonardo 8–9 December 1943
The Gully 10–19 December 1943
Ortona 20–28 December 1943 
 11–18 May 1944+
Gustav Line 11–18 May 1944
 18–30 May 1944
Hitler Line 18–24 May 1944+
 25 August-22 September 1944+
 2–13 September 1944
Misano Ridge
Bulgaria Village 13–14 September 1944
 14–21 September 1944+
San Fortunato 18–20 September 1944+
Naviglio Canal 12–15 December 1944
Fosso Vecchio 16–18 December 1944
+
Apeldoorn 11–17 April 1945
+

Southwest Asia
 Afghanistan

Customs and traditions
Fallen members of the regiment are said to have transferred to the White Battalion.

The regiment's mascot is a wooden Indian named Chief Petawawa-Much, who was taken on strength to replace Little Chief, a massive pewter Indian taken from the roof of a canning factory in Picton prior to the regiment's departure for England in 1939. Little Chief was lost during the Battle of France while the regiment evacuated. An unknown individual, in the interest of securing Chief Petawawa-Much's future, got him a social insurance number.

The regiment celebrates Pachino Day on 10 July every year with a spaghetti dinner, traditionally served with the cheapest red wine available.  This is to commemorate the unit's participation in the landings in Sicily on 10 July 1943 as part of Operation HUSKY.

In the Warrant Officers' & Sergeants' Mess in Belleville, the footprints of commanding officers can be found on the ceiling of the games room.  After a change of command, a pyramid is formed with junior officers on the bottom to hoist the new CO up to the ceiling to make his mark.

The former regimental colour was stolen from its case in the Belleville Armouries in 1960.  The staff for it was laid up with the queen's colour at Saint Mary Magdalene Anglican Church in Picton on 4 October 1964.  The CO at the time, Lieutenant-Colonel Angus Duffy, refused to wear his cap badge after the theft up until his death, as the colours were his personal responsibility.  The former regimental colour has never been located. The current colours were granted to the regiment in 1970.

Notable soldiers
Sir Mackenzie Bowell, : the fifth Prime Minister of Canada, served during the Fenian Raids as a Captain with the 15th Argyll Light Infantry and later retired from a long career with the Canadian Militia in 1874 with the rank of lieutenant-colonel in the 49th (Hastings) Battalion of Rifles (a founding regiment.)
Private Harold Joseph Pringle: the only soldier of the Canadian Army to be executed for a service offence during the Second World War and was also the last Canadian soldier to be executed. He was executed by firing squad.
Canadian Author Farley Mowat, : served as a platoon commander and as the Regiment's Intelligence Officer during the Second World War. He would author four books about the Regiment and his experiences during the Second World War: "The Regiment", "And No Birds Sang", "My Fathers' Son" and "Aftermath". Mowat left with the rank of Captain.
Lieutenant General Howard Douglas Graham, : Commanded the regiment from 1940-1941 and was later Chief of the General Staff of the Canadian Army from 1955-1958.
Golf Course Architect Geoffrey Cornish served as an officer (retired as Major) during the Second World War.
Corporal Mark Robert McLaren, : served as a member of the Hastings & Prince Edward Regiment from 2002 to 2007 before transferring the regular force with the 1st Battalion of the Royal Canadian Regiment based in Petawawa, Ontario. He was an Afghanistan veteran wounded during the A-10 strike incident which killed Pte Mark Graham in 2006. Cpl McLaren was subsequently killed in action on his second tour on 5 December 2008 by an improvised explosive device on his armoured vehicle during a joint patrol with Afghan National Army soldiers in the Arghandab District, west of Kandahar City, in Afghanistan. Corporal McLaren was awarded the Medal of Military Valour for his devotion to duty in the presence of the enemy. On 6 November 2008, Corporal McLaren's joint Canadian-Afghan patrol was ambushed in Kandahar Province, Afghanistan. The attack seriously injured his team's Afghan interpreter, paralyzing him and leaving him exposed to further enemy fire. Heedless to the incoming fire, Corporal McLaren crawled 10 metres to his colleague's position, extracted him to a safe location and administered first aid. Corporal McLaren's courage and selfless devotion to his team prevented the interpreter's immediate loss and allowed for his safe evacuation. In recognition of his service, a Canadian Coast Guard Hero-Class Inshore Patrol Vessel, CCGS Corporal Mark McLaren MMV, will be named after him on commissioning.
 James Arthur Mabee
 Kenneth Gurney Gallagher
 Thomas J. Bata

Armouries

Hastings and Prince Edward Regiment Museum

The Hastings and Prince Edward Regiment Museum is located in the Belleville Armoury in Belleville.  The museum preserves the history of the militia, specifically the
Hastings and Prince Edward Regiment, through the collection and preservation of military artifacts and documents of historical significance to the Regiment and its antecedent units.
The museum displays and illustrates in an appropriate manner the dress, weapons, and military equipment, and customs of the Regiment's heritage. It serves as a training medium to teach regimental history and to provide a scholarly basis for those studying the history of the militia, the Regiment and its antecedent units, and their historical significance in the Midland District of Ontario. The museum fosters in the local community an interest and sense of pride in the Regiment and its accomplishments.

The museum focuses on the history of the regiment, its activities in different wars, and the effect on area counties.  Exhibits include uniforms, weapons, medals, equipment, photographs, and other military and regimental memorabilia.   The museum is open several days a week.

The museum is affiliated with: CMA, CHIN, OMMC and Virtual Museum of Canada.

See also

 The Canadian Crown and the Canadian Forces
 Organization of Military Museums of Canada
 Military history of Canada
 History of the Canadian Army
 List of armouries in Canada
 Canadian Forces

Order of precedence

References

The Regiment (1955) is an account of the Hastings and Prince Edward Regiment written by Canadian author Farley Mowat, who served as an officer with the regiment during the Second World War.
 Duffy's Regiment: A History of the Hastings and Prince Edward Regiment by Kenneth B. Smith (14 Dec 2012)
 Decorations and Awards Received During World War II 1939-1945 By the Hastings and Prince Edward Regiment by R.D. Bradford (1986)
 "And No Birds Sang" (1979) explains Farley Mowat's experiences with the Regiment and the invasion of Sicily.

External links

 Official website 
 Regimental website
 The Hastings and Prince Edward Regiment Museum

Hastings and Prince Edward Regiment
Infantry regiments of Canada
British colonial regiments
Military units and formations of Ontario
Infantry regiments of Canada in World War II
Military units and formations established in 1920